The Pentagon Papers, officially titled Report of the Office of the Secretary of Defense Vietnam Task Force, is a United States Department of Defense history of the United States' political and military involvement in Vietnam from 1945 to 1967. Released by Daniel Ellsberg, who had worked on the study, they were first brought to the attention of the public on the front page of The New York Times in 1971. A 1996 article in The New York Times said that the Pentagon Papers had demonstrated, among other things, that the Johnson Administration had "systematically lied, not only to the public but also to Congress."

The Pentagon Papers revealed that the U.S. had secretly enlarged the scope of its actions in the Vietnam War with coastal raids on North Vietnam and Marine Corps attacks—none of which were reported in the mainstream media. For his disclosure of the Pentagon Papers, Ellsberg was initially charged with conspiracy, espionage, and theft of government property; charges were later dismissed, after prosecutors investigating the Watergate scandal discovered that the staff members in the Nixon White House had ordered the so-called White House Plumbers to engage in unlawful efforts to discredit Ellsberg.

In June 2011, the documents forming the Pentagon Papers were declassified and publicly released.

Contents 

Secretary of Defense Robert McNamara created the Vietnam Study Task Force on June 17, 1967, for the purpose of writing an "encyclopedic history of the Vietnam War". McNamara claimed that he wanted to leave a written record for historians, to prevent policy errors in future administrations, although Les Gelb, then director of Policy Planning at the Pentagon, has said that the notion that they were commissioned as a "cautionary tale" is a motive that McNamara only used in retrospect. McNamara told others, such as Dean Rusk, that he only asked for a collection of documents rather than the studies he received. Motives aside, McNamara neglected to inform either President Lyndon Johnson or Secretary of State Dean Rusk about the study. One report claimed that McNamara had planned to give the work to his friend, Robert F. Kennedy, who was seeking the Democratic presidential nomination in 1968. which he later denied, though admitting that he should have informed Johnson and Rusk.

Instead of using existing Defense Department historians, McNamara assigned his close aide and Assistant Secretary of Defense John McNaughton to collect the papers. McNaughton died in a plane crash one month after work began in June 1967, but the project continued under the direction of Defense Department official Leslie H. Gelb. Thirty-six analysts—half of them active-duty military officers, the rest academics and civilian federal employees—worked on the study. The analysts largely used existing files in the Office of the Secretary of Defense. In order to keep the study secret from others, including National Security Advisor Walt Rostow, they conducted no interviews or consultations with the armed forces, with the White House, or with other federal agencies.

McNamara left the Defense Department in February 1968, and his successor Clark Clifford received the finished study on January 15, 1969, five days before Richard Nixon's inauguration, although Clifford claimed he never read it. The study consisted of 3,000 pages of historical analysis and 4,000 pages of original government documents in 47 volumes, and was classified as "Top Secret – Sensitive". ("Sensitive" is not an official security designation; it meant that access to the study should be controlled.) The task force published 15 copies; the think tank RAND Corporation received two of the copies from Gelb, Morton Halperin and Paul Warnke, with access granted if at least two of the three approved.

Organization and content of the documents 
The 47 volumes of the papers were organized as follows:

I. Vietnam and the U.S., 1940–1950 (1 Vol.)
A. U.S. Policy, 1940–50
B. The Character and Power of the Viet Minh
C. Ho Chi Minh: Asian Tito? 

II. U.S. Involvement in the Franco–Viet Minh War, 1950–1954 (1 Vol.)
A. U.S., France and Vietnamese Nationalism
B. Toward a Negotiated Settlement

III. The Geneva Accords (1 Vol.)
A. U.S. Military Planning and Diplomatic Maneuver
B. Role and Obligations of State of Vietnam
C. Viet Minh Position and Sino–Soviet Strategy
D. The Intent of the Geneva Accords

IV. Evolution of the War (26 Vols.) 
A. U.S. MAP for Diem: The Eisenhower Commitments, 1954–1960 (5 Vols.) 
1. NATO and SEATO: A Comparison 
2. Aid for France in Indochina, 1950–54
3. U.S. and France's Withdrawal from Vietnam, 1954–56
4. U.S. Training of Vietnamese National Army, 1954–59
5. Origins of the Insurgency

B. Counterinsurgency: The Kennedy Commitments, 1961–1963 (5 Vols.) 
1. The Kennedy Commitments and Programs, 1961
2. Strategic Hamlet Program, 1961–63
3. The Advisory Build-up, 1961–67
4. Phased Withdrawal of U.S. Forces in Vietnam, 1962–64
5. The Overthrow of Ngo Dinh Diem, May–Nov. 1963

C. Direct Action: The Johnson Commitments, 1964–1968 (16 Vols.)
1. U.S. Programs in South Vietnam, November 1963–April 1965: NSAM 273 – NSAM 288 – Honolulu
2. Military Pressures Against NVN (3 Vols.)
a. February–June 1964
b. July–October 1964
c. November–December 1964
3. Rolling Thunder Program Begins: January–June 1965
4. Marine Combat Units Go to DaNang, March 1965
5. Phase I in the Build-Up of U.S. Forces: March–July 1965
6. U.S. Ground Strategy and Force Deployments: 1965–1967 (3 Vols.) 
a. Volume I: Phase II, Program 3, Program 4
b. Volume II: Program 5
c. Volume III: Program 6
7. Air War in the North: 1965–1968 (2 Vols) 
a. Volume I
b. Volume II
8. Re-emphasis on Pacification: 1965–1967
9. U.S.–GVN Relations (2 Vols.) 
a. Volume 1: December 1963 – June 1965
b. Volume 2: July 1965 – December 1967
10. Statistical Survey of the War, North and South: 1965–1967

V. Justification of the War (11 Vols.) 
A. Public Statements (2 Vols.) 
Volume I:  A – The Truman Administration
B – The Eisenhower Administration
C – The Kennedy Administration
Volume II:  D – The Johnson Administration
B. Internal Documents (9 Vols.) 
1. The Roosevelt Administration
2. The Truman Administration: (2 Vols.) 
a. Volume I: 1945–1949
b. Volume II: 1950–1952
3. The Eisenhower Administration: (4 Vols.) 
a. Volume I: 1953
b. Volume II: 1954–Geneva
c. Volume III: Geneva Accords – 15 March 1956
d. Volume IV: 1956 French Withdrawal – 1960
4. The Kennedy Administration (2 Vols.) 
Book I
Book II

VI. Settlement of the Conflict (6 Vols.) 
A. Negotiations, 1965–67: The Public Record
B. Negotiations, 1965–67: Announced Position Statements
C. Histories of Contacts (4 Vols.) 
1. 1965–1966
2. Polish Track
3. Moscow–London Track
4. 1967–1968

Actual objective of the Vietnam War: Containment of China 

Although President Johnson stated that the aim of the Vietnam War was to secure an "independent, non-Communist South Vietnam", a January 1965 memorandum by Assistant Secretary of Defense John McNaughton stated that an underlying justification was "not to help friend, but to contain China".

On November 3, 1965, Secretary of Defense Robert McNamara sent a memorandum to President Johnson, in which he explained the "major policy decisions with respect to our course of action in Vietnam". The memorandum begins by disclosing the rationale behind the bombing of North Vietnam in February 1965:

McNamara accused China of harboring imperial aspirations like those of the German Empire, Nazi Germany, Imperial Japan and the Soviet Union. According to McNamara, the Chinese were conspiring to "organize all of Asia" against the United States:

To encircle the Chinese, the United States aimed to establish "three fronts" as part of a "long-run effort to contain China":

However, McNamara admitted that the containment of China would ultimately sacrifice a significant amount of America's time, money and lives.

Internal affairs of Vietnam 

Years before the Gulf of Tonkin incident occurred on August 2, 1964, the U.S. government was indirectly involved in Vietnam's affairs by sending advisers or (military personnel) to train the South Vietnamese soldiers:
 Under President Harry S. Truman, the U.S. government aided France in its war against the communist-led Viet Minh during the First Indochina War.
 Under President Dwight D. Eisenhower, the U.S. government played a "direct role in the ultimate breakdown of the Geneva settlement" in 1954 by supporting the fledgling South Vietnam and covertly undermining the communist country of North Vietnam.
 Under President John F. Kennedy, the U.S. government transformed its policy towards Vietnam from a limited "gamble" to a broad "commitment".
 Under President Johnson, the U.S. government began waging covert military operations against communist North Vietnam in defense of South Vietnam.

Role of the United States in the rise of President Diem 

In a section of the Pentagon Papers titled "Kennedy Commitments and Programs", America's commitment to South Vietnam was attributed to the creation of the country by the United States. As acknowledged by the papers:

In a sub-section titled "Special American Commitment to Vietnam", the papers emphasized once again the role played by the United States:

More specifically, the United States sent US$28.4 million worth of equipment and supplies to help the Diem regime strengthen its army. In addition, 32,000 men from South Vietnam's Civil Guard were trained by the United States at a cost of US$12.7 million. It was hoped that Diem's regime, after receiving a significant amount of U.S. assistance, would be able to withstand the Viet Cong.

The papers identified General Edward Lansdale, who served in the Office of Strategic Services (OSS) and worked for the Central Intelligence Agency (CIA), as a "key figure" in the establishment of Diem as the President of South Vietnam, and the backing of Diem's regime thereafter. As written by Lansdale in a 1961 memorandum: "We (the U.S.) must support Ngo Dinh Diem until another strong executive can replace him legally."

Role of the United States in the overthrow of Diem's regime 

According to the Pentagon Papers, the U.S. government played a key role in the 1963 South Vietnamese coup, in which Diem was assassinated. While maintaining "clandestine contact" with Vietnamese generals planning a coup, the U.S. cut off its aid to President Diem and openly supported a successor government in what the authors called an "essentially leaderless Vietnam":

As early as August 23, 1963, an unnamed U.S. representative had met with Vietnamese generals planning a coup against Diem. According to The New York Times, this U.S. representative was later identified to be CIA officer Lucien Conein.

Proposed operations 
The Director of Central Intelligence, John A. McCone, proposed the following categories of military action:
 Category 1 – Air raids on major Viet Cong supply centers, conducted simultaneously by the Republic of Vietnam Air Force and the United States Air Force (codenamed Farmgate)
 Category 2 – Cross-border raids on major Viet Cong supply centers, conducted by South Vietnamese units and US military advisers.
 Category 3 – Limited air strikes on North Vietnamese targets by unmarked planes flown exclusively by non-US aircrews.

However, McCone did not believe these military actions alone could lead to an escalation of the situation because the "fear of escalation would probably restrain the Communists". In a memorandum addressed to President Johnson on July 28, 1964, McCone explained:

Barely a month after the Gulf of Tonkin incident on August 2, 1964, National Security Advisor McGeorge Bundy warned that further provocations should not be undertaken until October, when the government of South Vietnam (GVN) would become fully prepared for a full-scale war against North Vietnam. In a memorandum addressed to President Johnson on September 8, 1964, Bundy wrote:

While maritime operations played a key role in the provocation of North Vietnam, U.S. military officials had initially proposed to fly a Lockheed U-2 reconnaissance aircraft over the country, but this was to be replaced by other plans.

Leak
Daniel Ellsberg knew the leaders of the task force well. He had worked as an aide to McNaughton from 1964 to 1965, had worked on the study for several months in 1967, and Gelb and Halperin approved his access to the work at RAND in 1969. Now opposing the war, Ellsberg and his friend Anthony Russo photocopied the study in October 1969 intending to disclose it. Ellsberg approached Nixon's National Security Advisor Henry Kissinger, Senators William Fulbright and George McGovern, and others, but none were interested.

In February 1971, Ellsberg discussed the study with The New York Times reporter Neil Sheehan, and gave 43 of the volumes to him in March. Before publication, The New York Times sought legal advice. The paper's regular outside counsel, Lord Day & Lord, advised against publication, but in-house counsel James Goodale prevailed with his argument that the press had a First Amendment right to publish information significant to the people's understanding of their government's policy.

The New York Times began publishing excerpts on June 13, 1971; the first article in the series was titled "Vietnam Archive: Pentagon Study Traces Three Decades of Growing US Involvement". The study was dubbed The Pentagon Papers during the resulting media publicity. Street protests, political controversy, and lawsuits followed.

To ensure the possibility of public debate about the papers' content, on June 29, US Senator Mike Gravel, an Alaska Democrat, entered 4,100 pages of the papers into the record of his Subcommittee on Public Buildings and Grounds. These portions of the papers, which were edited for Gravel by Howard Zinn and Noam Chomsky, were subsequently published by Beacon Press, the publishing arm of the Unitarian Universalist Association of Congregations. A federal grand jury was subsequently empaneled to investigate possible violations of federal law in the release of the report. Leonard Rodberg, a Gravel aide, was subpoenaed to testify about his role in obtaining and arranging for publication of the Pentagon Papers. Gravel asked the court (in Gravel v. United States) to quash the subpoena on the basis of the Speech or Debate Clause in Article I, Section 6 of the United States Constitution.

That clause provides that "for any Speech or Debate in either House, [a Senator or Representative] shall not be questioned in any other Place", meaning that Gravel could not be prosecuted for anything said on the Senate floor, and, by extension, for anything entered to the Congressional Record, allowing the papers to be publicly read without threat of a treason trial and conviction. When Gravel's request was reviewed by the U.S. Supreme Court, the Court denied the request to extend this protection to Gravel or Rodberg because the grand jury subpoena served on them related to a third party rather than any act they themselves committed for the preparation of materials later entered into the Congressional Record. Nevertheless, the grand jury investigation was halted, and the publication of the papers was never prosecuted.

Later, Ellsberg said the documents "demonstrated unconstitutional behavior by a succession of presidents, the violation of their oath and the violation of the oath of every one of their subordinates." He added that he leaked the Papers to end what he perceived to be "a wrongful war".

The Nixon administration's restraint of the media 

President Nixon at first planned to do nothing about publication of the study, since it embarrassed the Johnson and Kennedy administrations rather than his; however, Henry Kissinger convinced the president that not opposing the publication set a negative precedent for future secrets. The administration argued Ellsberg and Russo were guilty of a felony under the Espionage Act of 1917, because they had no authority to publish classified documents. After failing to persuade The New York Times to voluntarily cease publication on June 14, Attorney General John N. Mitchell and Nixon obtained a federal court injunction forcing The New York Times to cease publication after three articles. The New York Times publisher Arthur Ochs Sulzberger said:

The newspaper appealed the injunction, and the case New York Times Co. v. United States (403 U.S. 713) quickly rose through the U.S. legal system to the Supreme Court.

On June 18, 1971, The Washington Post began publishing its own series of articles based upon the Pentagon Papers; Ellsberg had given portions to The Washington Post reporter Ben Bagdikian. Bagdikian brought the information to editor Ben Bradlee. That day, Assistant U.S. Attorney General William Rehnquist asked The Washington Post to cease publication. After the paper refused, Rehnquist sought an injunction in U.S. district court. Judge Murray Gurfein declined to issue such an injunction, writing that "[t]he security of the Nation is not at the ramparts alone. Security also lies in the value of our free institutions. A cantankerous press, an obstinate press, a ubiquitous press must be suffered by those in authority to preserve the even greater values of freedom of expression and the right of the people to know." The government appealed that decision, and on June 26 the Supreme Court agreed to hear it jointly with The New York Times case. Fifteen other newspapers received copies of the study and began publishing it.

The Supreme Court allows further publication 

On June 30, 1971, the Supreme Court decided, 6–3, that the government failed to meet the heavy burden of proof required for prior restraint injunction. The nine justices wrote nine opinions disagreeing on significant, substantive matters.

Thomas Tedford and Dale Herbeck summarized the reaction of editors and journalists at the time:

Legal charges against Ellsberg 

Ellsberg surrendered to authorities in Boston, and admitted that he had given the papers to the press: "I felt that as an American citizen, as a responsible citizen, I could no longer cooperate in concealing this information from the American public. I did this clearly at my own jeopardy and I am prepared to answer to all the consequences of this decision". He was indicted by a grand jury in Los Angeles on charges of stealing and holding secret documents. Federal District Judge William Matthew Byrne, Jr. declared a mistrial and dismissed all charges against Ellsberg and Russo on May 11, 1973, after it was revealed that agents acting on the orders of the Nixon administration illegally broke into the office of Ellsberg's psychiatrist and attempted to steal files; representatives of the Nixon administration approached the Ellsberg trial judge with an offer of the job of FBI directorship; several irregularities appeared in the government's case including its claim that it had lost records of illegal wiretapping against Ellsberg conducted by the White House Plumbers in the contemporaneous Watergate scandal. Byrne ruled: "The totality of the circumstances of this case which I have only briefly sketched offend a sense of justice. The bizarre events have incurably infected the prosecution of this case." Ellsberg and Russo were freed due to the mistrial; they were not acquitted of violating the Espionage Act.

In March 1972, political scientist Samuel L. Popkin, then assistant professor of Government at Harvard University, was jailed for a week for his refusal to answer questions before a grand jury investigating the Pentagon Papers case, during a hearing before the Boston Federal District Court. The Faculty Council later passed a resolution condemning the government's interrogation of scholars on the grounds that "an unlimited right of grand juries to ask any question and to expose a witness to citations for contempt could easily threaten scholarly research".

Gelb estimated that The New York Times only published about five percent of the study's 7,000 pages. The Beacon Press edition was also incomplete. Halperin, who had originally classified the study as secret, obtained most of the unpublished portions under the Freedom of Information Act and the University of Texas published them in 1983. The National Security Archive published the remaining portions in 2002. The study itself remained formally classified until 2011.

Impact 
The Pentagon Papers revealed that the United States had expanded its war with the bombing of Cambodia and Laos, coastal raids on North Vietnam, and Marine Corps attacks, none of which had been reported by the American media. The most damaging revelations in the papers revealed that four administrations (Truman, Eisenhower, Kennedy, and Johnson) had misled the public regarding their intentions. For example, the Eisenhower administration actively worked against the Geneva Accords. The John F. Kennedy administration knew of plans to overthrow South Vietnamese leader Ngo Dinh Diem before his death in a November 1963 coup. President Johnson had decided to expand the war while promising "we seek no wider war" during his 1964 presidential campaign, including plans to bomb North Vietnam well before the 1964 Election. President Johnson had been outspoken against doing so during the election and claimed that his opponent Barry Goldwater was the one that wanted to bomb North Vietnam.

In another example, a memo from the Defense Department under the Johnson Administration listed the reasons for American persistence:
 70% – To avoid a humiliating U.S. defeat (to our reputation as a guarantor).
 20% – To keep [South Vietnam] (and the adjacent) territory from Chinese hands.
 10% – To permit the people [of South Vietnam] to enjoy a better, freer way of life.
 ALSO – To emerge from the crisis without unacceptable taint from methods used.
 NOT – To help a friend, although it would be hard to stay in if asked out.

Another controversy was that President Johnson sent combat troops to Vietnam by July 17, 1965,  before pretending to consult his advisors on July 21–27, per the cable stating that "Deputy Secretary of Defense Cyrus Vance informs McNamara that President had approved 34 Battalion Plan and will try to push through reserve call-up."

In 1988, when that cable was declassified, it revealed "there was a continuing uncertainty as to [Johnson's] final decision, which would have to await Secretary McNamara's recommendation and the views of Congressional leaders, particularly the views of Senator [Richard] Russell."

Nixon's Solicitor General Erwin N. Griswold later called the Pentagon Papers an example of "massive overclassification" with "no trace of a threat to the national security". The Pentagon Papers''' publication had little or no effect on the ongoing war because they dealt with documents written years before publication.

After the release of the Pentagon Papers, Goldwater said:

Senator Birch Bayh, who thought the publishing of the Pentagon Papers was justified, said:

Les Gelb reflected in 2018 that many people have misunderstood the most important lessons of the Pentagon Papers:

Full release in 2011
On May 4, 2011, the National Archives and Records Administration announced that the papers would be declassified and released to the Richard Nixon Presidential Library and Museum in Yorba Linda, California, on June 13, 2011. The release date included the Nixon, Kennedy, and Johnson Libraries and the Archives office in College Park, Maryland.

The full release was coordinated by the Archives's National Declassification Center (NDC) as a special project to mark the anniversary of the report. There were still eleven words that the agencies having classification control over the material wanted to redact, and the NDC worked with them, successfully, to prevent that redaction. It is unknown which 11 words were at issue and the government has declined requests to identify them, but the issue was made moot when it was pointed out that those words had already been made public, in a version of the documents released by the House Armed Services Committee in 1972.

The Archives released each volume of the Pentagon Papers as a separate PDF file, available on their website.

In films and television

Films
 The Pentagon Papers (2003), directed by Rod Holcomb and executive produced by Joshua D. Maurer, is a historical film made for FX, in association with Paramount Television and City Entertainment, about the Pentagon Papers and Daniel Ellsberg's involvement in their publication. The film represents Ellsberg's life, beginning with his work for RAND Corp. and ending with the day on which his espionage trial was declared a mistrial by a federal court judge. The film starred James Spader, Paul Giamatti, Alan Arkin, and Claire Forlani.
 The Most Dangerous Man in America: Daniel Ellsberg and the Pentagon Papers (2009) is an Oscar nominated documentary film, directed by Judith Ehrlich and Rick Goldsmith, that follows Ellsberg and explores the events leading up to the publication of the Pentagon Papers.
 The Post (2017) is a historical drama film directed and co-produced by Steven Spielberg from a script written by Liz Hannah and Josh Singer about a pair of The Washington Post employees who battle the federal government over their right to publish the Pentagon Papers. The film stars Tom Hanks as Ben Bradlee and Meryl Streep as Katharine Graham. Daniel Ellsberg is played by Matthew Rhys.

Television
  "On September 13, 2010, The New York Times Community Affairs Department and POV presented a panel discussion on the Pentagon Papers, Daniel Ellsberg, and the Times. The conversation, featuring Daniel Ellsberg, Max Frankel, former The New York Times executive editor, and Adam Liptak, The New York Times Supreme Court reporter, was moderated by Jill Abramson, managing editor of The New York Times" and former Washington bureau chief, marking the 35th anniversary of the Supreme Court ruling.
  "In 1971 Defense Department analyst, former U.S. Marine company commander and anti-Communist Daniel Ellsberg leaked the Pentagon Papers to the media. In this talk, Ellsberg presents an explosive inside account of how and why he helped bring an end to the Vietnam War and Richard Nixon's presidency. He also talks about the current potential for war with Iraq and why he feels that would be a major mistake for the United States." Series: Voices [1/2003] [Public Affairs] [Humanities] [Show ID: 7033]"

See also

 Afghanistan Papers
 "Credibility gap"
 Edward Snowden
 Global surveillance disclosures
 James L. Greenfield
 Operation Popeye — U.S. weather modification operation, revealed in the Pentagon Papers United States diplomatic cables leak
 WikiLeaks

References

Works cited
 

Further reading
 The Pentagon Papers: The Defense Department History of United States Decisionmaking on Vietnam. Boston: Beacon Press. 5 vols. "Senator Gravel Edition"; includes documents not included in government version.  & .
 Neil Sheehan. The Pentagon Papers. New York: Bantam Books (1971). .
 Daniel Ellsberg. Secrets: A Memoir of Vietnam and the Pentagon Papers. New York: Viking (2002). .
 "Marcus Raskin: For him, ideas were the seedlings for effective action" (obituary of Marcus Raskin), The Nation, Jan 29. / Feb 5. 2018, pp. 4, 8. Marcus Raskin in 1971, on receiving "from a source (later identified as ... Daniel Ellsberg) 'a mountain of paper' ... that became known as the Pentagon Papers ... [p]lay[ed] his customary catalytic role [and] put Ellsberg in touch with The New York Times reporter Neil Sheehan ... A longtime passionate proponent of nuclear disarmament, [Raskin] would also serve in the 1980s as chair of the SANE / Freeze campaign." (p. 4.)
 George C. Herring (ed.) The Pentagon Papers: Abridged Edition. New York: McGraw-Hill (1993). .
 George C. Herring (ed.) Secret Diplomacy of the Vietnam War: The Negotiating Volumes of the Pentagon Papers (1983).

External links

  The complete, unredacted report.
  Complete text with supporting documents, maps, and photos.
  a resource site that supports a currently playing docu-drama about the Pentagon Papers''. The site provides historical context, time lines, bibliographical resources, information on discussions with current journalists, and helpful links.
  (audio/video and transcript).
 
  Part of WCBS 880's celebration of 40 years of newsradio.
 
 
 

 
1967 documents
1968 documents
1969 documents
1971 in American politics
Classified documents
News leaks
Nixon administration controversies
Presidential scandals in the United States
Reports of the United States government
United States documents
Vietnam War
Whistleblowing in the United States
Works subject to a lawsuit
Works originally published in The New York Times